Garnavik (also Romanized as Garnāvīk and Gernāvīk; also known as Karnāvīk) is a village in Qatur Rural District, Qatur District, Khoy County, West Azerbaijan Province, Iran. At the 2006 census, its population was 1,022, in 175 families.

References 

Populated places in Khoy County